The Chosen is an American historical drama television series created, directed and co-written by Christian filmmaker Dallas Jenkins. It is the first multiseason series about the life and ministry of Jesus of Nazareth. Primarily set in Judaea and Galilee in the 1st century, the series centers on Jesus and the different people who met and followed him. The series stars Jonathan Roumie as Jesus, alongside Shahar Isaac, Elizabeth Tabish, Paras Patel, Noah James and George H. Xanthis.

Noticing that there had never been a multi-season, episode-based portrayal of Jesus that could be "binge watched" like shows on streaming mediums such as Netflix, Jenkins intended to differ from previous portrayals of Jesus by crafting a story arc that focused more deeply on those who encountered Jesus and viewing him through their eyes. He wanted to present Jesus in a way that is more "personal, intimate, [and] immediate".

The producers have used innovative methods for finance and release, primarily through crowdfunding and distributed by Angel Studios. Using a dedicated app and website, the series is free to watch. Viewers are encouraged, but not required, to pay it forward by contributing to fund future seasons. Fundraising for the first season as well as subsequent seasons continues to make The Chosen the most successful crowdfunded TV series or film project. As of 2021, viewers had contributed $40 million towards its production. In late 2022, the creators partnered with a new nonprofit, the Come and See Foundation, to manage funding, which allows contributors to receive a tax deduction for their contribution.

In addition to crowdfunding and the pay it forward model, revenue is also generated through several other channels. The show is licensed to other streaming platforms and TV networks, such as Amazon Prime Video, Peacock and Netflix. Merchandise and video sales provide additional sources of revenue, as have limited premiere runs in cinemas. The show is further adapted into a series of novels by Jenkins's father, author Jerry B. Jenkins, a series of graphic novels by Corvus Comics, and companion Bible study materials published by David C. Cook.

According to an analysis commissioned by the producers, 108 million have seen at least part of the show, as of 2022. Translation into as many as 600 languages is being funded by the Come and See Foundation.

Synopsis
The first season is set in 1st century Galilee, where Jesus starts to build a group for his ministry, inviting several people with different backgrounds. As he performs his first miracles, Jesus calls the redeemed woman Mary Magdalene, the stonemason Thaddeus, the choir member Little James, the fishermen Simon, Andrew, Big James, and John, the caterer Thomas and the vintner Ramah, and the tax collector Matthew to follow him. Jesus also meets with Nicodemus, a Pharisee who is perplexed by the acts of Jesus. The season culminates with the group traveling through Samaria, where, after revealing himself to Photina, a Samaritan woman, Jesus publicly launches his ministry.

Beginning in Samaria, the second season moves into nearby regions, such as Syria and Judea, where Jesus continues to build his group of students. As he continues to perform miracles while preparing for an important sermon, Jesus additionally calls John the Baptizer's disciple Philip, the architect Nathanael, and the Zealot Simon Z. As word of Jesus continues to spread throughout the region, he encounters both opportunities and difficulties. Preparations are made for his Sermon on the Mount with the help of the business apprentice Judas Iscariot.

The group returns to Capernaum in the third season, with the increasing popularity of Jesus troubling different societal and political groups, including the Romans and the Pharisees. Following the Sermon on the Mount, Jesus returns to his hometown, resulting in a shift in his ministry. He sends his twelve apostles, two by two, to preach and perform miracles without him, leading to the disciples facing their biggest challenge yet.

Cast and characters

Cast notes

Episodes

Background and production

Development

In 2017, working through his production company,  Vertical Church Films, Dallas Jenkins released a feature-length film, The Resurrection of Gavin Stone, which underperformed at the box office. Trying to figure out what his next opportunity would be, Jenkins began binge watching different television shows and realized there had never been a multi-season show about Jesus that could be watched in the same way. Jenkins returned to a script for a short film called The Shepherd, which he had originally written specifically for a Christmas Eve service at his church, Harvest Bible Chapel in Elgin, Illinois. It was filmed on a friend's farm in Marengo. Expanding on that idea, he came up with the concept for The Chosen as a multi-season story arc about the life of Jesus that could build a backstory based on cultural and historical context.

Faith-based video filtering service VidAngel became aware of the film and became interested in expanding the concept. At the time, VidAngel was embroiled in a lawsuit with major Hollywood studios and thus seeking original content to distribute. They suggested putting the short film on Facebook as a concept pilot to generate interest for a multi-season series. The short film received over 15 million views around the world.

VidAngel, along with Jenkins and video marketing strategist Derral Eves, used the crowdfunding business model to produce the first season of The Chosen by utilizing a provision of the JOBS Act of 2016. This allowed them to offer a share of ownership and profits from the company to online investors rather than the arbitrary "perks" offered by regular crowdfunding. At the end of January 2019, the first fundraising round had raised over $10.2 million from over 16,000 investors for the project, which surpassed Mystery Science Theater 3000 as the top crowdfunded TV series project. Each investor received equity in "The Chosen LLC", which is regulated by the US Securities and Exchange Commission (SEC). Their equity stake allows them to share in profits not only from the show itself but also from other revenue sources, such as merchandise, books, and bible study materials. Majority shareholders will not receive a share of the profits until the original investors earn 120% of their investments.

After funding the first season by selling equity, the show has utilized traditional crowdfunding for subsequent seasons, along with a model that offers more traditional crowdfunding perks, such as appearing as an extra in the film. The average contribution through crowdfunding efforts is $65. Season 2 fundraising had raised over $6 million from more than 300,000 contributors as of July 1, 2020. As with previous seasons, the producers continue to use the pay it forward model to help fund the development of the show's future seasons. In October 2022, the creators partnered with a new nonprofit, the Come and See Foundation, which was created to manage the show's funding. The nonprofit status allows contributors to receive a tax deduction for their donations. 

The show also raises revenue through licensing to other streaming platforms and TV networks, video and merchandise sales, and limited premiere runs in movie theaters.

In 2022, it was announced that Angel Studios had raised $47 million in funding for the series from venture capital firms.

Seven seasons are planned.

Script
In contrast with typical Bible-focused productions, Jenkins has given more depth to his scripts by adding backstories to various characters from the Gospels, without contradicting material that is present. This is noted in the opening credits of the first episode, which include the following:

Although the show has an evangelical tendency, there are consultants from three Christian faith traditions providing input. Acting as consultants are Messianic rabbi Jason Sobel from Fusion Global Ministries, Catholic priest and national director of Family Theater Productions Father David Guffey, and professor of New Testament at Biola University Dr. Doug Huffman. They review scripts and provide facts or context on the biblical, cultural, and socio-political history of the storyline.

Jenkins said he draws creative inspiration from shows like Friday Night Lights and The Wire, while writers Ryan Swanson and Tyler Thompson list Game of Thrones, The Wire, Battlestar Galactica, and Star Trek as their influences.

Casting
The show features many people of color as actors, which is not often the case in television and film based on the Bible. Jenkins avoided "big stars" and "white people", instead trying to re-create a picture of first-century Capernaum, which, being on a trade route, would have reflected a diversity of ethnicities and backgrounds.

Various members of the cast have described a deep connection to the show, the story, and their character. Elizabeth Tabish, who was considering leaving her acting career, described it as a "dream role". Jonathan Roumie said he always aims to "empty out as much of himself as possible" to allow the Holy Spirit to work in him through both the script he received and his performance onscreen. In describing his preparation for the role, Roumie said that he does "a good bit of reading and rereading the source material" but that most of the preparation is "in the spiritual department". Roumie said his accent is based a combination of the accent of his father, who is from Egypt, and his sister-in-law, who is from Palestine.

Filming
Season 1 was filmed over 60 days mostly in and around Pooleville and Weatherford, Texas, supplemented by a sound stage and visual effects in a Dallas studio. After searching online for suitable locations, the producers settled on the existing Capernaum Village in Pooleville, a venue that offers both film set rental and live experiences for tourists, to recreate the historical Capernaum.

Season 2 moved filming to Utah's version of ancient Israel in Utah County, where the Church of Jesus Christ of Latter-day Saints (LDS Church) had built a replica Jerusalem movie set to film scenes for their Bible and Book of Mormon videos. The set is part of the LDS Motion Picture Studios South Campus, and its use by The Chosen marks the first time a production not affiliated with the LDS Church has been granted access to film on this set, which was built to authentically replicate most of the primary locations of the ancient city. Filming was done during October and November 2020. Commenting on how much the Utah desert resembles the Holy Land, Dallas Jenkins said that they could not re-create it anywhere else—"you can't even get this in Israel".

Being filmed during the COVID-19 pandemic created challenges for the production of season 2. Two thousand extras came for filming the Sermon on the Mount scene, all of whom were required to obtain a negative PCR test prior to filming. Safety precautions such as multiple testing and proper PPE kits for the cast and crew members were also applied. Following COVID-19 protocols increased the production costs by an additional $750,000. Anyone coming onto the set had to be tested in advance and upon arrival, longer meal breaks were required, and all hair and makeup stations had to be sanitized regularly. Jenkins indicated that they experienced less than five positive cases during filming.

Filming for season 3 moved production back to Texas, to a site in Midlothian selected for its similarities with the Middle East in both topography and weather. There The Chosen partnered with the National Christian Foundation and the Impact Foundation to construct a $20 million production complex on the site of the Salvation Army's Camp Hoblitzelle. The complex will include a soundstage, set workshops, and a replica of Capernaum. The Chosen will lease the facility, which will also be used for other film and television projects. Beginning in April 2022, filming for season 3 included a four-day shoot for the Feeding of the 5,000 scene, which used nearly 12,000 extras from 36 countries, most of whom came at their own expense and made their own costumes.

Music
To compose the music for the series, creator Dallas Jenkins called on longtime friend Jars of Clay vocalist and songwriter Dan Haseltine. Not only had Haseltine been a friend of Jenkins, but he had also worked on previous projects with him in the past, composing the music for Hometown Legend. Initially, Haseltine was not interested, believing that there were plenty of similar projects and that the world didn't need another "cheesy Jesus story". After Jenkins convinced him that The Chosen would be different, Haseltine brought in fellow Jars of Clay multi-instrumentalist Matthew S. Nelson to assist with composition. Haseltine has noted that musical influences include Middle Eastern, Indian drone, Delta Blues, and "slave spirituals".

Themes 
Executive producer Dallas Jenkins wanted to produce a multi-season series about Jesus that could be "binge watched". Hoping to distinguish the series from previous portrayals of Jesus, Jenkins wanted to "dig deeper into the people who encountered Jesus", presenting a story that is more "personal, intimate, [and] immediate". The show seeks to give backstories to both the characters and the settings. There are storylines that explore vice and addiction, autism, and physical disability.

Actor Jordan Walker Ross, who plays Little James, has scoliosis and minor cerebral palsy, which cause him to walk with a limp, a disability that he was asked to hide in previous acting jobs. Rather than hide it, Jenkins has used Walker Ross's physical disability to explore story themes in which Jesus heals some people but not others.

Jenkins also specifically highlights the fact that there were key moments in which women were intentionally chosen by Jesus to be a vital part of his ministry.

Other themes within the storylines include "complex relationships, suspense, political intrigue, and charged emotional moments", as well as marital conflict and financial struggles.

Release and distribution

Streaming and broadcast 
The first season was initially released on VidAngel's subscription service and also available for DVD purchase. Viewership was sluggish. In March and April 2020, in response to the COVID-19 pandemic, the first season of The Chosen was made available for free through its app, at which time viewership spiked. Jenkins stated that revenue actually went up after they made it free to watch, attributing it to "God's impossible math". The producers have since made the free-to-watch model permanent, using a pay it forward model for viewers to contribute funding to make it free for other users. 

Primary distribution continues to be through their own app and website. New episodes typically premiere via livestream on YouTube and Facebook, and then released on the app and website. The app includes bonus content, such as Bible round-tables and exclusive "after show" content, as well as allowing viewers to make tax-deductible contributions to fund production.

In exchange for allowing production of the show at the LDS Church's Goshen set, BYUtv was granted streaming and broadcast rights in late 2020, the only broadcast network airing the show at the time. The series has since been licensed for release through several secular, Christian and family-oriented streaming and broadcast platforms. By early 2021, broadcast was extended to include Amazon Prime Video, Trinity Broadcasting Network, Peacock and UPtv. In 2022, it was released on Netflix. The series has also expanded to international platforms, such as Canal+ in France.

Theatrical releases 
The Chosen has partnered with Fathom Events for cinema exhibition. The first was a Christmas special titled Christmas with The Chosen: The Messengers, which opened in 1,700 theaters on December 1, 2021. It grossed $13.5 million with one million tickets sold, breaking a record for Fathom Events. The effort was to satisfy demand from fans as well as an attempt to drive people back to movie theaters. The first two episodes of season 3 were released in theaters prior to streaming. Screened in more than 2,000 theaters throughout the US, as well as the United Kingdom, Ireland, Canada, Australia and New Zealand, it earned more than $10 million on the opening weekend, outgrossing several Hollywood films.

Jenkins indicated an interest to theatrically release season 3's penultimate and finale episodes as well, noting that the feeding of the 5,000 is more suited to the big screen. When Jenkins announced ticket sales during a livestream, the resulting demand initially crashed the Fathom Events website. The finale opened in theaters on February 2, 2023, and was #1 at the box office with $1.67 million.

International distribution 
The producers desired for The Chosen to be seen by over one billion people and broadcast in every country in the world. In October, 2022, the Come and See Foundation was formed as a nonprofit to help fund the translation and global distribution of the series. With no current budget, the foundation is currently operating on funding from an anonymous donor. The goal of the Come and See Foundation is that the show be dubbed in 100 languages and subtitled in 500 more. Currently, season 1 is dubbed in twelve languages and subtitled in sixty-two, and season 2 is dubbed in seven languages and subtitled in twenty additional languages.

Reception
The show's popularity began largely as an underground phenomenon, going unnoticed and unreviewed by major publications. Until it was added to Peacock in 2021, The Chosen was not available on any major cable network or streaming service, but it was still able to achieve more than 300 million streaming views in that time. It has a large and devoted fan base, raising a significant portion of its funding through crowdsourcing, achieving success through its "pay-it-forward" viewing model, and breaking ticket records for its theatrical releases. The success of the series is attributed to artistic storytelling and cultural relevance, while staying true to the message of the gospels. The creators credit the success of the series to a desire for quality faith-based content.

Not all reception has been positive. The creators have been accused an array of things including heresy against Mary, being produced by Mormons and injecting Mormon theology, and taking too much liberty with scripture.

Reviews 
While praising the show for its acting, direction, and speculative storytelling beyond typical Bible stories, The Atlantic's Chris DeVille has suggested that the show's popularity among Christians is due in part to scarcity, noting that the quality of most "Christian" entertainment is usually not at a level produced by Hollywood and that its success so far has arrived "not in spite of its insularity, but because of it". Other Christian commentators have also praised the series for its production value, noting that it raises the bar for other faith-based productions. While DeVille concluded that "for the most part, the series seems to be finding its fans among the converted", Texas Monthly stated that the show has the most mainstream crossover potential since Touched by an Angel.

The review aggregator Rotten Tomatoes reported that 100 percent of critics have given season 1 a positive review based on 9 reviews, with an average rating of 7.80/10. 

Writing in Film Threat, Alan Ng called the series "smart and insightful to a contemporary audience".

Viewership 
Producers estimate that the first 16 episodes had been viewed 312 million times as of November 2021. According to Sandy Padula, an independent consultant hired by the producers, over 108 million people globally had watched at least part of one episode of The Chosen as of November 2022.

Awards and accolades
Episode 8 from Season 1 ("I Am He") earned two Movieguide Award nominations in 2020, with Epiphany Prize for Inspiring Television Program for the series and Grace Prize, Television for Jonathan Roumie, the actor who portrays Jesus.

The series won the Best Film/Television Impact category at the 2021 K-Love Fan Awards.

The series won the Inspirational Film/Series of the Year at the 2022 Dove Awards.

The Chosen received the Museum of the Bible's Pillar Award in 2022.

Media information

Marketing 
Jenkins and VidAngel initially focused on social media to promote their idea for the show by releasing the short film The Shepherd on Facebook. After the first season of the show was released, they began to utilize their pay it forward model to assist with promotion. In addition, Jenkins has built a large following of fans by regularly hosting livestream events and "viewing parties". The production company employs a dedicated social media staff as well as a dedicated video team for "behind the scenes" coverage that is used in social media promotion. According to Jenkins, their success is based on direct communication with viewers.

Promotional trailers are developed to appeal to specific denominations.

In 2022, as part of the producers' Easter marketing campaign, 48 of the 70 billboards for the show nationwide were changed to appear as though they had been defaced or vandalized with phrases like "The Chosen is boring" and "Chosensux.com". The URL directed users to a website called "The Chosen Is Not Good", which depicted Satan as a character trying to get people to not watch the show. As a result of the campaign, many fans of the show were concerned that the defacement was real and, in April, Dallas Jenkins issued an apology to fans for having not mentioned anything about the campaign.

Merchandising 
To complement its crowd-sourced fundraising model, The Chosen generates revenue through merchandise sales including T-shirts, hats, books, and DVDs. In addition to general merchandise, The Chosen has partnered with Christian publishers such as David C. Cook and Broadstreet Publishing to produce companion study guides, devotionals, and Bible study materials. The show is also being adapted into a series of graphic novels by Corvus Comics.

Soundtracks for season 1 and 2 have been released. Songwriter Dan Haseltine believes there will be additional projects by other artists influenced and inspired by the series.

Companion Bible study materials 
To complement the show content, Dallas Jenkins, along with his wife Amanda, and Douglas Huffman have released companion Bible studies that follow the show. Huffman, a professor of New Testament at Biola University, also serves as a consultant to the show. The first study, from David C. Cook publishers, was released January 21, 2021. In addition to a book, the study includes digital resources, video clips, teacher guides, and promotional materials.

Books 
Dallas Jenkins's father, Left Behind author Jerry B. Jenkins, has contributed a novelization of each of the show's first two seasons. An additional third novel is planned. Jenkins has collaborated in the past with his father on Hometown Legend and Midnight Clear, a full-length feature film based on one of his father's short stories.

The elder Jenkins notes that this is atypical, since TV shows or movies are usually based on a novel; but in this case, it is the other way around, with the novel being based on the show in what he refers to as "a backward deconstruction". Jenkins notes that the biggest challenge in this approach is adding detail to the story that is not part of the Biblical account.

See also 

 The Resurrection of Gavin Stone
 The Wingfeather Saga

References

External links

 
 
 
 

2010s American drama television series
2017 American television series debuts
2020s American drama television series
American religious television series
Crowdfunding projects
Cultural depictions of John the Baptist
Cultural depictions of Mary, mother of Jesus
Cultural depictions of Saint Peter
English-language television shows
Portrayals of Jesus on television
Television series based on the Bible
Television series set in the Roman Empire
Works based on the New Testament
Autism in television